John S. Hall (born John Charles Hall, September 2, 1960) is an American poet, author, singer and lawyer perhaps best known for his work with King Missile, an avant-garde band that he co-founded in 1986 and has since led in various incarnations.

Biography

Early life
John S. Hall was born in Brooklyn, New York and grew up in Manhattan's West Village. He recalls being "very quiet and shy" as a child and a social outcast as an adolescent. In 1978 he graduated from Stuyvesant High School.

Participation in poetry scene
In the early 1980s, Hall began participating in the Lower East Side poetry scene. He read his poems at such venues as Speakeasy and ABC No Rio. According to performance poet Cristin O'Keefe Aptowicz, Hall "became an easily recognizable figure in the scene: pale, bald, dressed mostly in black and white, with wire-rimmed glasses and a porkpie hat."

Hall has long been a vocal opponent of slam poetry, taking issue with such factors as its inherently competitive nature and what he considers its lack of stylistic diversity. In a 2005 interview by Aptowicz, he recalled seeing his first slam, at the Nuyorican Poets Café:

Despite his reservations about slam poetry, Hall has performed alongside slam poets on such television programs as PBS's The United States of Poetry, MTV's Spoken Word Unplugged, and HBO's Russell Simmons Presents Def Poetry.

Early bands
Hall performed in at least two musical groups before co-founding King Missile. One was Purple Sunshine, a "hippie band" Hall started because he "was really into hippies and LSD, and tuning in and dropping out, and all that stuff." The other was You Suck, which Hall says was inspired by a band led by punk musician Mykel Board:

Over the objections of the band, Board released the You Suck single with a pornographic album cover. The single was not a commercial success, and the band broke up shortly after its release.

King Missile

In 1985, Hall began presenting his work at open mic poetry readings. After three shows, he became a "featured" poet at the Backfence, a performance space in Manhattan's East Village. In 1986, feeling that "20 minutes of me reading poetry would be totally boring"," Hall asked his guitarist friend Dogbowl to augment his performances with original music. Dogbowl agreed, and with the addition of bassist Alex DeLaszlo, drummer R.B. Korbet, and xylophonist George O'Malley, King Missile (Dog Fly Religion) was born. The band released two albums on the Shimmy Disc label, 1987's Fluting on the Hump and 1988's They, and then dissolved because Dogbowl wanted to pursue a solo career.

After Dogbowl's departure, Hall asked Bongwater guitarist Dave Rick to help him put together a new band. Rick recruited multi-instrumentalist Chris Xefos, and Hall retained They drummer Steve Dansiger. Hall dubbed the new lineup King Missile, dropping the parenthetical "Dog Fly Religion" subtitle "since that was [Dogbowl's] idea." In late 1989 and early 1990, the band recorded the album Mystical Shit, and in 1990 released it on Shimmy Disc. On the strength of the single "Jesus Was Way Cool", the album hit #1 on the CMJ charts, and the band was signed by a major label, Atlantic Records. This series of events led Hall to make a habit of joking, "'Jesus' got me signed to Atlantic Records." Shortly after getting signed, Hall released an album on Shimmy Disc with permission from Atlantic: Real Men, a side project recorded with producer and Shimmy Disc founder Kramer. King Missile was featured in the 1990 documentary CutTime which chronicled the East Village music scene at the time.

King Missile recorded three albums for Atlantic: 1991's The Way to Salvation, 1992's Happy Hour, and 1994's King Missile. Happy Hour spawned a modest hit in "Detachable Penis," which reached No. 25 on the Billboard Modern Rock Tracks chart. Nonetheless, after the commercial failure of King Missile, the band was dropped from Atlantic, and broke up shortly thereafter because, according to Hall, "there was no reason to stay together."

In 1996, Hall released a "solo album," The Body Has a Head, on the German label Manifatture Criminali. The album featured considerable input from multi-instrumentalists Sasha Forte, Bradford Reed, and Jane Scarpantoni. With these musicians, as well as They cellist Charles Curtis, Hall formed a new band, King Missile III (pronounced "the third"). In 1998, the new lineup released its "debut" album, Failure, on Shimmy Disc. Curtis and Scarpantoni left the band after the release of Failure, and King Missile III continued as a trio, releasing two more albums, 2003's The Psychopathology of Everyday Life and 2004's Royal Lunch.

In 2015, Hall formed a new lineup of King Missile, King Missile IV, with the band LoveyDove. They toured New Zealand, and released an EP, called This Fuckin' Guy on Powertool Records. King Missile's classic lineup also reformed for live shows in 2015, continuing through 2016 and 2017.

In 2016, Hall started two new bands: Unusual Squirrel and Sensation Play. Unusual Squirrel released their debut album, Fuck Sandwich, through Bandcamp.

Books
Hall has released two books, both on Soft Skull Press. The first, 1997's Jesus Was Way Cool, is a collection of 40 poems recorded on King Missile and Hall solo albums, plus a never-recorded poem, "Hope."

The second, 2007's Daily Negations, is a dark-humored satire of self-help books. In it, Hall presents a negative thought for each day of the calendar year (including Leap Day). He posts daily readings of these thoughts on his Facebook and Instagram pages.

Dominant themes of work
Asked in a 2003 interview to speak about the common themes of his work, Hall replied:

Other recurring subjects of Hall's work include religion and spirituality (e.g., "The Fish That Played the Ponies," "Jesus Was Way Cool," "The God"), nihilism (e.g., "No Point," "Ed," "Jim"), and masochism (e.g., "Pickaxe," "Take Me Home," "My Lover").

Writing and performance styles
Hall's writing varies in format from straightforward narrative to abstract, disjointed free verse. The writing frequently contains absurdist imagery (e.g., "A giant testicle rolled over a Waffle House, killing several clowns") and/or adynata (e.g., "P]igeons came along and ate his eyes, and seagulls ripped his stomach out, and pelicans ate his liver, and his spleen popped out all on its own and turned into a harmonica and played a pleasant little tune. Then out came his pancreas, which turned into the dog that bit him last week, and it bit him again and again and again many times").

Hall's performance style is also eclectic, his delivery ranging from a deadpan monotone to melodic tenor singing to overwrought screaming. In a 1998 interview, Hall expressed a preference for his spoken material over his sung: "Most of my work that I prefer is this type, and in most cases, the singing stuff [on albums] is filler, with the exception of songs here and there... [F]or the most part, I'm better at the spoken shit."

Stage name
In a 2003 missive to his electronic mailing list, Hall explained how he chose his stage name:

Legal career
After the collapse of the second incarnation of King Missile, Hall decided to attend law school. He graduated cum laude from the Benjamin N. Cardozo School of Law at Yeshiva University in Manhattan, and after graduation co-founded Heraty Hall, a law firm specializing in entertainment law. Hall later left the firm to go into solo practice until 2006, when he took a position as a corporate analyst at a law firm.

Asked by Aptowicz in the aforementioned 2005 interview if he became a lawyer out of disillusionment with the contemporary poetry scene, Hall laughed and replied, "I became a lawyer to make money."

Political and personal beliefs
Hall has used his vehement dislike of President George W. Bush and his administration as subject matter for several King Missile III songs, including "The President," "Suggested Response to the Coming Crises," and "Another Political Poem." He campaigned for Democratic candidate John Kerry in the United States presidential election of 2004.

Hall considers himself both Buddhist and agnostic. On his MySpace page, he summarizes his faith as follows: "I don't believe in God, but I do believe in something. I'm just not sure what."

Hall is also a vegan.

Family
Hall is the older brother of Francis Hall, better known as Faceboy, an actor, producer, and activist working in the New York City arts community. As of 2014, Hall was married with a daughter he and his wife had in 2007.

References in popular culture
American rapper MC Lars acknowledges Hall in his song "My Rhymes Rhyme": "Shout-outs to Wesley Willis, Adam G. and John Hall / Word to MC Paul Barman; hey, return my call!" Lars also praises King Missile in his song "The Dialogue": "Nine Inch Nails, Primus, "Weird Al" and King Missile / Influenced me like a postmodern epistle."

Discography

With King Missile (Dog Fly Religion)

With King Missile

With King Missile III

With King Missile IV

With Unusual Squirrel

With Kramer

Solo

Bibliography
Jesus Was Way Cool (Soft Skull Press, 1997)
Daily Negations (Soft Skull Press, 2007)

References

External links

 John S. Hall MySpace page
 King Missile MySpace page
 Heraty Law (Hall's former legal practice)

1960 births
Living people
Musicians from Brooklyn
People from Greenwich Village

Stuyvesant High School alumni
Benjamin N. Cardozo School of Law alumni
American spoken word poets
American male poets
American male singers
American humorists
American Buddhists
American agnostics
New York (state) lawyers
Performance art in New York City
King Missile members
21st-century American poets
21st-century American male writers